The Senate Judiciary Subcommittee on Federal Courts, Oversight, Agency Action and Federal Rights is one of seven subcommittees within the United States Senate Committee on the Judiciary. It was created at the beginning of the 113th Congress. It was previously known as the Subcommittee on Oversight, Agency Action, Federal Rights and Federal Courts

Jurisdiction
(1) Federal court jurisdiction, administration and management; (2) Rules of evidence and procedure; (3) Creation of new courts and judgeships; (4) Bankruptcy; (5) Legal reform and liability issues; (6) Local courts in territories and possessions; (7) Administrative practices and procedures including agency rulemaking and adjudication; (8) Judicial review of agency action; (9) Third party enforcement of federal rights; (10) Oversight of the Department of Justice grant programs, as well as government waste and abuse; (11) private relief bills other than immigration; and (12) Oversight of the Foreign Claims Settlement Act.

Members, 118th Congress

Historical subcommittee rosters

117th Congress

116th Congress

External links
 Subcommittee on Federal Courts, Oversight, Agency Action, and Federal Rights, official site

Judiciary Federal Courts